The G. G. Gerber Building is an historic building in Portland, Oregon's Pearl District. The building is listed on the National Register of Historic Places,  and currently houses Deschutes Brewery.

See also

 National Register of Historic Places listings in Northwest Portland, Oregon

References

External links
 
 Gerber, G. G., Building (Portland, Oregon) at Oregon Digital

1919 establishments in Oregon
Buildings and structures completed in 1919
National Register of Historic Places in Portland, Oregon
Pearl District, Portland, Oregon